The Civil Aviation Authority (CAA-HU, PLH), earlier the Civil Aviation Administration (Légügyi Igazgatóság, LUI), was a government agency of Hungary that acted as that country's civil aviation authority. The head office was located in Building 13 of Budapest Ferihegy International Airport Terminal 1 in Budapest.

In 2007 the successor agency, the National Transport Authority, began operations on 1 January 2007. The Transportation Safety Bureau (previously the Civil Aviation Safety Bureau of Hungary) is the agency that investigates transport accidents and incidents.

References

External links

 Civil Aviation Authority (Archive) 

Government agencies of Hungary
2007 disestablishments in Hungary
Hungary
Civil aviation in Hungary
Aviation organisations based in Hungary